Puylaurens is a commune in the Tarn department in southern France. The poet Suzon de Terson was born here in 1657.

See also
Communes of the Tarn department

References

Communes of Tarn (department)